William Webster (12 November 1810 – 10 April 1896) was Dean of Aberdeen and Orkney from 1887  to 1896.
He was educated at the University of Aberdeen and ordained in 1835. After a curacy at Drumlithie  he was the incumbent at New Pitsligo until his appointment as Dean.

References

External links

1810 births
1896 deaths
Alumni of the University of Aberdeen
Deans of Aberdeen and Orkney